Jason Bartlett may refer to:
Jason Bartlett (baseball) (born 1979), retired American baseball player
Jason Bartlett (politician), American politician
Jason Bartlett (singer), contestant in Australian Idol in 2009